Ardit Hila (born 6 January 1993) is an Albanian professional footballer who plays as a midfielder, most recently for Albanian club Tirana.

Club career

Elbasani
Hila made his professional debut on 16 May 2011 by playing full-90 minutes in a 1–2 home defeat to Shkumbini Peqin in the last championship game of 2010–11 season. Elbasani was eventually relegated after finishing in last position, collecting only 12 points.

Teuta Durrës
Following Elbasani's relegation from the Albanian Superliga, Hila signed a three-year contract with Teuta Durrës along with his teammate Emiljano Musta.

Hila scored his first goal for his new side on 4 October 2015 in a 3–0 league win over Bylis Ballsh. Later, he went on to score the only goal of both quarter-final legs of the Albanian Cup against Kukësi.

Hila enjoyed his most productive season in the 2017–18 under Gugash Magani and later Gentian Begeja, scoring 11 goals, including 9 in league, finishing it as team joint-top scorer along with Latif Amadu. In addition to that, he also had the worst disciplinary record among his teammates, receiving 13 yellow cards during the season.

He left the club on 26 May 2018 with the aim a pursuing a career outside of Albania.

Partizani Tirana
On 26 June 2018, fellow Superliga side Partizani Tirana announced to have acquired Hila on a 1+1 contract.

FC Prishtina
He signed with FC Prishtina for 2 years.

Career statistics

Honours
Elbasani
Albanian First Division: 2013–14

Partizani
Kategoria Superiore: 2018–19

Prishtina
Kosovar Cup: 2019–20

Tirana
Albanian Supercup: 2022

References

External links
FSHF profile

1993 births
Living people
Footballers from Elbasan
Albanian footballers
Association football midfielders
Albanian expatriate footballers
KF Elbasani players
KF Teuta Durrës players
FK Partizani Tirana players
SC Gjilani players
FC Prishtina players
FK Kukësi players
Kategoria e Parë players
Kategoria Superiore players
Albanian expatriate sportspeople in Kosovo
Expatriate footballers in Kosovo